Jawaharlal Nehru Stadium located in Indore, India, is a multi-purpose stadium used for cricket, football, Kho Kho, and basketball with a capacity for 25,000 people.

However, all the international as well as national cricket matches take place at the "Holkar Stadium which is situated at Race Course Road, Indore and a plethora of different sports activities take place at the Nehru Stadium which also partly serves as the Headquarters of the Air-Force wing of the Western Command of the National Cadet Corps (India).

Nehru Stadium sports a statue of Col. C.K. Nayudu, Indore's favourite son of that era, outside its main entrance as a concession to tradition.

As of 19 August 2017, it has hosted 9 One Day Internationals (ODIs).

History

The Stadium attained infamy when an ODI match between India and Sri Lanka on 25 December 1997 was abandoned after the third over of the first innings  due to the captains and umpires agreeing that the pitch was too dangerous, to which the match referee concurred. A 25-over exhibition match was held on an adjoining pitch to placate the sell-out crowd of 25,000.

The stadium was subsequently suspended by the ICC from holding matches for two years.

The Stadium hosted its last ODI match on 31 March 2001, where Sachin Tendulkar created history by becoming the first player to reach 10,000 runs in ODI cricket.

Holkar Stadium in the same city hosted the last ODI match between India and Australia in September 2017. 
As of 2020, it is unknown if Nehru Stadium will host another international match.

One Day International cricket

The stadium has hosted following ODI matches till date.

Records

The highest score by a team is Indian national cricket team against Australia national cricket team- 299/8 on 31 Mar 2001. The lowest team score is by Sri Lanka national cricket team against Indian national cricket team- 17/1. The leading run scorers in the stadium were Ravi Shastri - 193 runs, Sachin Tendulkar- 163 runs and Gary Kirsten- 105 runs. The leading wicket takers here is K Srikanth- 5 wickets.

List of Centuries

Key
 * denotes that the batsman was not out.
 Inns. denotes the number of the innings in the match.
 Balls denotes the number of balls faced in an innings.
 NR denotes that the number of balls was not recorded.
 Parentheses next to the player's score denotes his century number at Edgbaston.
 The column title Date refers to the date the match started.
 The column title Result refers to the player's team result

One Day Internationals

List of Five Wicket Hauls

Key

One Day Internationals

See also
Yeshwant Club, Indore
Daly College, Indore
Daly College Ground, Indore
Yeshwant Club Ground, Indore

References

External links
 Cricinfo Website - Ground Page
 cricketarchive Website - Ground Page

Monuments and memorials to Jawaharlal Nehru
Cricket grounds in Madhya Pradesh
Sports venues in Indore
Defunct cricket grounds in India
Sports venues completed in 1964
1964 establishments in Madhya Pradesh
1987 Cricket World Cup stadiums
20th-century architecture in India